The men's 20 kilometre individual biathlon competition at the 1968 Winter Olympics was held on 12 February, at Autrans.  Each miss of the target cost two minutes, while hitting the outer circle cost one minute.

Results 

Two relatively inexperienced biathletes dominated the individual event. Magnar Solberg was one of only two men to shoot clear, and had the second fastest ski time, more than two minutes faster than the third best time. Aleksandr Tikhonov skied a minute faster than Solberg, but took two minutes in penalties, and ended up with silver, nearly four minutes ahead of their closest pursuer. Vladimir Gundartsev took bronze for the Soviet union, two minutes in penalties complementing the fifth-fastest ski time. Defending world champion Viktor Mamatov, and world silver medalist Stanisław Szczepaniak each took just one minute in penalties, but their ski times left them on the outside of the medals, Szczepaniak in 4th and Mamatov in 7th.

References

Individual